Inussivik is an indoor arena located in Nuuk, the capital city of Greenland, that was originally constructed for the 2002 Arctic Winter Games. The arena is used for sports, especially team handball which is considered the national sport of Greenland, concerts, and cultural events.

Inussivik has a capacity of around 1,000 people and is located on a complex with Nuuk Stadium, the country's national stadium.

The arena played host to the 2018 Pan American Men's Handball Championship.

Buildings and structures in Nuuk
Indoor arenas in Greenland
Sport in Nuuk